Thomas Goddard (9 August 1777 – 3 January 1814) was the member of Parliament for Cricklade in England from 1806 to 1812.

He was a captain with the 2nd Wiltshire Militia in 1796, and a major in 1799. In 1800 he was a captain with the Swindon yeomanry.

He was a member of the Goddard family associated with Wiltshire, Hampshire and Berkshire and the son of Ambrose Goddard.

References 

Members of the Parliament of the United Kingdom for Cricklade
1777 births
1814 deaths
Thomas
British Militia officers
British Yeomanry officers